Aloiampelos ciliaris, formerly Aloe ciliaris, the common climbing-aloe, is a thin, tough, rapidly growing succulent plant from South Africa.

Appearance

They can be differentiated from other Aloiampelos species by the way that the soft, white, hair-like teeth (=ciliaris) that grow along the margins of the leaves, extend all the way around the stem, at the base of the leaf.

The fleshy leaves themselves are strongly recurved (helping to anchor the tall stems in dense thickets and assist the plant in climbing). The leaf sheaths are conspicuously striped green and white.

These plants grow very quickly, producing long, thin, untidy stems that shoot upwards, producing large bright orange-red flowers once they reach the sun. If there are no nearby trees to act as host and support, it just forms a straggly shrub.

The red flowers appear mostly from November to April.

Distribution

Aloiampelos ciliaris is naturally widespread in the coastal and thicket vegetation of the Eastern Cape, flowing over the Western Cape border. Especially in dry river valleys where they grow in thorny forests, their long stems pushing rapidly upwards and out through the thicket canopy. Their recurved leaves act as hooks, allowing the plant to anchor itself in the thick vegetation.

This species seems to have developed from a smaller, rarer, more delicate plant now classified as a subspecies, Aloe ciliaris subsp. tidmarshi,  and to have spread out across the region relatively recently. The ancestral subspecies remains restricted to the Albany thickets of the Eastern Cape, between Grahamstown and Uitenhage. While Aloiampelos ciliaris was originally indigenous to the dry thicket vegetation of the Eastern Cape, from the Baviaanskloof mountains to as far as the Ciskei, this adaptable species has been widely introduced and currently occurs across much of South Africa.

They grow very easily from cuttings, and they have been planted in gardens all over South Africa. This is the fastest growing of all aloes and their relatives.

An introduced population in Kenya was reported in 1950 by the botanist G. W. Reynolds (1950:353).

Related species
Aloiampelos ciliaris is one of the species in the genus that now grows throughout Southern Africa. Some other species are: Aloiampelos tenuior, Aloiampelos gracilis, Aloiampelos commixta, Aloiampelos juddii and Aloiampelos striatula.

References

Asphodeloideae
Flora of the Cape Provinces
Endemic flora of South Africa
Garden plants of Southern Africa
Creepers of South Africa